The coat of arms of Bonaire was established in 1986 by the island council, when Bonaire was still part of the Netherlands Antilles. It remained the coat of arms of Bonaire after the dissolution of the Netherlands Antilles and the subsequent change of Bonaire's constitutional status into a special municipality of the Netherlands in 2010.

It consists of a blue shield, above which a crown is placed. On the shield a compass, ship's wheel, and a red six-pointed star can be found. The royal decree of 20 September 2010, no. 10.002198 granted this arms to Bonaire as a public body of the Netherlands.

See also
 Coat of arms of the Netherlands
 Coat of arms of the Netherlands Antilles

References

External links
Hoge Raad van Adel (High Council of Nobility)'s Database page for the coat of arms of Bonaire
Jaarverslag 2010 Hoge Raad van Adel

Bonaire
Bonaire
Bonaire
Bonaire
Bonaire
1986 establishments in the Netherlands Antilles